Cristina Castro Salvador (born 4 April 1969, in Bilbao) is a retired Spanish athlete who specialised in sprinting events. She represented her country at the 1992 Summer Olympics as well as one outdoor and one indoor World Championships.

Competition record

Personal bests
Outdoor
100 metres – 11.36 (+1.6 m/s, Salamanca 1992)
200 metres – 24.63 (+1.8 m/s, Birmingham 1987)
Indoor
60 metres – 7.50 (Seville 1991)
200 metres – 23.93 (Glasgow 1990)

References

All-Athletics profile

1969 births
Living people
Sportspeople from Bilbao
Spanish female sprinters
Olympic athletes of Spain
Athletes (track and field) at the 1992 Summer Olympics
World Athletics Championships athletes for Spain
Athletes (track and field) at the 1991 Mediterranean Games
Mediterranean Games competitors for Spain
Athletes from the Basque Country (autonomous community)
Olympic female sprinters